Infames is a Mexican telenovela that premiered on 13 February 2012, and concluded on 12 August 2012. It's a Spin-off of the telenovela El octavo mandamiento. The series is stars Vanessa Guzmán, Luis Roberto Guzmán, Miguel Ángel Muñoz, and Ximena Herrera.

Cast

Starring 
 Vanessa Guzmán as Ana Leguina / Preciado
 Luis Roberto Guzmán as Porfirio Cisneros
 Miguel Ángel Muñoz as Joaquín Navarro / José María "Chema" Barajas
 Ximena Herrera as Dolores "Lola" Medina / Sara Escalante

Also starring 
 Lisette Morelos as Sol Fuentes
 Eréndira Ibarra as Casilda Barreiro
 Carlos Torrestorija as Juan José Benavides
 Juan Ríos Cantú as Ignacio Cabello
 Andrés Montiel as Emilio Ferreira
 Bianca Calderón as Claudia de Benavides
 Ruy Senderos as Ricardo "Ricky" Benavides
 Nicolás Krinis as Javier Peregrino
 Aldo Gallardo as Felipe Sánchez Trejo
 Aurora Gil as Amanda Ortíz
 Juan Martín Jauregui as Daniel Herrera
 Heriberto Méndez as Luis Navarrete
 Claudia Ramírez as María Eugenia Tequida
 Joaquín Garrido as Leopoldo Rivas

Recurring 
 Lourdes Reyes as Yalda Adam
 Jaime Del Aguila as Tenoch Gómez Lovaina
 Alejandro del Toro as Guardaespaldas Leo
 Citlali Galindo as Antonia Murillo
 Mario Loría as Schmidt
 Marco Treviño as Jorge Antonio Barreiro
 Itahisa Machado as Maura
 Bárbara Singer as Sofía Navarro

References

External links 
 

Mexican telenovelas
Argos Comunicación telenovelas
Spanish-language telenovelas
2012 Mexican television series debuts
2012 Mexican television series endings
2012 telenovelas